Hans Neuerburg (2 November 1932 – 2004) was a German footballer who played for Sportfreunde 05 Saarbrücken and the Saarland national team as a goalkeeper.

References

1932 births
2004 deaths
German footballers
Saar footballers
Saarland international footballers
Sportfreunde 05 Saarbrücken players
Association football goalkeepers